Eulimella limbata is a species of sea snail, a marine gastropod mollusk in the family Pyramidellidae, the pyrams and their allies.

References

External links
 Eulimella limbata (Suter, 1907), World Register of Marine Species

limbata
Gastropods described in 1907